Dunston UTS Football Club is a football club based in the Dunston area of Gateshead, Tyne and Wear, England.

History
The club was established as a works team by John Thompson and other HMSO employees in 1975 and were originally known as Whickham Sports. They initially played in the Newcastle City Amateur League, before moving up to the Northern Amateur League, where they won the league and League Cup double in 1977–78. In 1980 they joined the Northern Combination and in 1982 the club was renamed Dunston Mechanics. They went on to win the League Cup in 1983–84 and the league and League Cup double in 1986–87. At the end of the season they were renamed Dunston Federation Brewery and moved up to the Wearside League.

Dunston won back-to-back Wearside League titles in 1988–89 and 1989–90. After finishing as runners-up and winning the League Cup in 1990–91, the club were promoted to Division Two of the Northern League. In the club's second season in Division Two, they won the title, earning promotion to Division One. After winning three successive League Cups in 1997–98, 1998–99 and 1999–2000, the club finished as Division One runners-up in 2000–01. They went on to win back-to-back doubles of the Division One title and the League Cup in 2003–04 and 2004–05. In 2007 the club was renamed Dunston Federation after the brewery withdrew its sponsorship, before becoming Dunston UTS in 2009 as part of a sponsorship deal with UTS Engineering. In 2011–12 the club reached the final of the FA Vase, beating West Auckland Town 2–0 in the final at Wembley Stadium. They won the League Cup in 2017–18 with a 1–0 win against Bishop Auckland in the final.

In 2018–19 Dunston were Division One champions for a third time, earning promotion to Division One North West of the Northern Premier League.

Ground
After success in the Newcastle City Amateur League, the club leased land from Gateshead Metropolitan Borough Council, which was to become the Wellington Road ground. It was renamed the UTS Stadium as part of the sponsorship deal that saw the club renamed in 2009. The ground currently has a capacity of 2,500, of which 150 is seated and 400 covered.

Honours
FA Vase
Winners 2011–12
Northern League
Division One champions 2003–04, 2004–05, 2018–19
Division Two champions 1992–93
League Cup winners 1997–98, 1998–99, 1999–2000, 2003–04, 2004–05, 2017–18
Cleator Cup winners 1999–2000, 2000–01, 2003–04, 2004–05, 2005–06, 2018–19
Wearside League
Champions 1988–89, 1989–90
League Cup winners 1990–91
Northern Combination
Champions 1986–87
League Cup winners 1983–84, 1986–87
Northern Amateur League
Champions 1977–78
League Cup winners 1977–78, 1978–79
League Shield winners 1978–79, 1979–80

Records
Best FA Cup performance: Fourth qualifying round, 2003–04, 2018–19
Best FA Trophy performance: Third qualifying round 1993–94, 1994–95
Best FA Vase performance: Winners, 2011–12
Record attendance: 2,520 vs Gateshead, FA Cup fourth qualifying round, 20 October 2018

See also
Dunston UTS F.C. players
Dunston UTS F.C. managers

References

External links
Official website

 
Football clubs in England
Football clubs in Tyne and Wear
Association football clubs established in 1975
1975 establishments in England
Wearside Football League
Northern Football League
Works association football teams in England